The Porto is a small coastal river in the northwest of the department of Corse-du-Sud, Corsica, France.

Location

It crosses the communes of Cristinacce, Évisa, Marignana and Ota.
It rises in the Cristinacce commune to the south of the  Capu a Rughia, just west of the border with Haute-Corse.
It flows in a generally southwest direction to the village of Cristinacce, then west past the villages of Évisa, Marignana and Ota to enter the Golfe de Porto in the village of Porto.
The D84 road follows the lower part of the river.

Bridges

Two of the bridges are classified as historical monuments.
The Zaglia Bridge crosses the Tavulella stream in the gorges of Spelunca. It was classified as a Historic Monument by decree of June 26, 1990.
The Pianella Bridge spans the Porto at Ponte-Vecchju in Ota. The Pianella bridge, which dates from the fifteenth century, was classified as a historic monument by decree of November 29, 1976.

Mouth

The port of Porto is guarded by a square tower at its entrance.
The Tour génoise de Porto was built by the Genoese, and stands on a rocky promontory looking over the sea.
It has been renovated and hosts an exhibit on the fortifications of the Corsican shores.
The coastal village has large buildings that seem inappropriate for a small settlement that cannot expand due to lack of available land.
There is a pebble beach, and behind the coastal barrier there are eucalyptus plantations.

Valley
The lower and middle parts of the valley are in the Sevi Infora landscape.
The Porto river descends to the coast through a deep and narrow valley.
There is luxuriant vegetation in the valley floor below bare rocky walls.
It is surrounded by olive groves, holm oaks and chestnut trees.
Upstream of Ota a dominant position named U Castellu was settled in prehistoric times, and later was the site of a castle that controlled access to Porto from the fertile valleys of the high mountain territory.

Edward Lear  (1812–1888) wrote of the central valley in his Journal of an English Landscape Designer (1868),

The upper valley is in the Sevi Ingrentu landscape, and contains the valleys of the Lonca and Aïtone tributaries of the Porto, and  the Tavulella tributary of the Aïtone.
The three valleys are almost parallel, and are oriented southwest.
Each valley has a narrow gorge cut into the mountain barrier, which higher up gives way to a more open terrain.
Edward Lear wrote in 1868 “Look at the high peaks, beyond the pass, the massive dark pine forest contrasts with the golden green undulations of the birch wood. While strolling in the heart of a shaded valley, you notice the lights on the road, or the immaculate snow on the verges. Omnipresent beauty."

Hydrology

Measurements of the river flow were taken at the Ota station from 1996 to 2021.
The maximum daily flow was  recorded on 6 November 2000. 

Tributaries

The following streams (ruisseaux) are tributaries of the Porto (ordered by length) and sub-tributaries:

 Lonca: 
 Forca Ai Tassi: 
 Calavalonda: 
 San Leonardo: 
 Casa Infurcata: 
 Pozzitondi: 
 Corgola: 
 Piscio: 
 Lumio: 
 Aitone: 
 Spurtellu: 
 Casterica: 
 Luzzichelli: 
 Sindacchi: 
 Carchetu: 
 Rughia: 
 Manuella: 
 Punticelli: 
 Novali Piani: 
 Enova: 
Vitrone: 
 Lamatoghiu: 
 Campoghiu: 
 Pirellu: 
 Pertusella: 
 Stazzona: 
 Onda: 
 Vitullu: 
 Piotto: 
 Campi Solcu: 
 Riu: 
 Vignale: 
 Faeta: 
 Ariola: 
 Fiume Seccu: 
 Erbaghiu Vecchiu: 
 La Rocca: 
 Albia: 
 Bartoli: 
 Aghiola: 
 Cotto: 
 Crocicchia: 
 Pettinelli: 
 Rotte:

References

Sources

Rivers of Corse-du-Sud
Rivers of France
Coastal basins of the Mediterranean Sea in Corsica